The Atlantic–Congo languages are the largest demonstrated family of languages in Africa. They have characteristic noun class systems and form the core of the Niger–Congo family hypothesis. They comprise all of Niger–Congo apart from Mande, Dogon, Ijoid, Siamou, Kru, the Katla and Rashad languages (previously classified as Kordofanian), and perhaps some or all of the Ubangian languages. 's "Western Nigritic" corresponded roughly to modern Atlantic–Congo.

In the infobox, the languages which appear to be the most divergent are placed at the top. The Atlantic branch is defined in the narrow sense, while the former Atlantic branches Mel and the isolates Sua, Gola and Limba, are split out as primary branches; they are mentioned next to each other because there is no published evidence to move them; Volta–Congo is intact apart from Senufo and Kru.

In addition, Güldemann (2018) lists Nalu and Rio Nunez as unclassified languages within Niger-Congo.

There are a few poorly attested languages, such as Bayot and Bung, which may prove to be additional branches.

Comparative vocabulary
Sample basic vocabulary for reconstructed proto-languages of different Atlantic-Congo branches:

References 

 
Niger–Congo languages
Language families